The European Universities Volleyball Championships were the first championships, along with the European Universities Basketball Championships, to be included on the EUSA Sports Program.

They have been organised annually since 2001.

The European Universities Volleyball Championships are coordinated by the European University Sports Association, along with the 18 other sports on the program of the European Universities Championships.

Overview

External links

References
 

voleyball
International volleyball competitions